Callipielus fumosa is a species of moth of the family Hepialidae. It is known from Chile.

References

External links
Hepialidae genera

Moths described in 1983
Hepialidae
Endemic fauna of Chile